Waggonbaufabrik Josef Rathgeber was a railway coach manufacturer, founded in 1852 in Munich, which closed in 1972. It produced railway vehicles, buses, elevators and automatic doors. In 1972 it was taken over by Firma F. X. Meiller, who use the former factory,Rathgeber-Werk, in München-Moosach to make tilting devices for construction vehicles.

References 

Transport in Bavaria
Rolling stock manufacturers of Germany
Vehicle manufacturers of Germany